Nixon is an unincorporated community in Hardin County, Tennessee. Nixon is located on Tennessee State Route 128, north of the Tennessee River's Pickwick Landing Dam.

Demographics

References

Unincorporated communities in Hardin County, Tennessee
Unincorporated communities in Tennessee